Gracillaria albicapitata is a moth of the family Gracillariidae. It is known from the islands of Hokkaidō and Honshū in Japan and the Russian Far East.

The wingspan is 9.8–12.5 mm.

The larvae feed on Fraxinus lanuginosa, Fraxinus mandshurica, Syringa amurensis, Syringa reticulata and Syringa vulgaris. They mine the leaves of their host plant. Young larvae mine directly into the middle layer of the parenchymal tissue of the leaf or leaflet. The mine made by the larvae of the first three instars is irregularly large blotchy or wide linear, and inter-parenchymal, with a few weak wrinkles on both the upper and lower surfaces. In the fourth instar, the larvae leave the mine for another leaf or leaflet, and roll it from the tip towards the underside. The leaf roll made by the larvae of the last two instars is very large and cigarette-like in form. The cocoon is usually found at the margin of fallen leaves in the field. It is buff whitish and boat-shaped. The species hibernates in the pupal stage.

References

Gracillariinae
Moths of Japan
Moths described in 1930